Clarence Lung (1914-1993) was a film and television actor. He appeared in films such as Dragon Seed, Song of the Sarong, Experiment in Terror, Prisoner Of War, Operation Petticoat, China and The Hundred Days of the Dragon. Among the television programs he appeared in were  Secret Agent X-9 and China Smith.

Biography
Lung was born in Idaho to George Lung and Lillian Pfeiffer. His parents divorced when he was young, and he grew up in Colorado with his mother and sister.

Lung's television credits include Guys Like O'Malley, a story about an observation post during the Korean war, in which he appeared along with James Best and Neville Brand. In film, one of his early roles was a small part in The Good Earth. Later he played Attorney Yung in Experiment in Terror, a film that starred Glenn Ford and Lee Remick. He had a supporting role in Dragon Seed that starred Katharine Hepburn. In that film, he had the distinction of being the only American actor of Chinese descent to play an adult member of the Tan family and have screen credit. He appeared alongside John Lupton and James Hong in the 1959 film Blood and Steel.

Later on, he ran one of actor Benson Fong's Ah Fong restaurants in Los Angeles County.

Filmography

Links
 
 Clarence Lung at Aveleyman

References

1914 births
1993 deaths
People from Boise, Idaho
Male actors from Idaho
American male film actors
American male television actors
People from Quitman, Texas
20th-century American male actors